Scotopteryx kuznetzovi is a species of moth of the family Geometridae. It was first described by C. A. Wardikian in 1957. It is found in Iran and Turkey.

References

Moths described in 1957
Scotopteryx